The Japanese shrew mole (Urotrichus talpoides) or  is a species of mammal in the family Talpidae. It is endemic to Japan and is found on Honshu, Shikoku, Kyushu, Awaji Island, Shodo Island, Oki Islands, Tsushima Island, Goto Islands, Mishima Island (Yamaguchi Prefecture), and Awashima Island (Niigata Prefecture), but is absent from Hokkaido, which is north of Blakiston's Line. It is one of three Urotrichini and it is the only extant species in the genus Urotrichus. It is common between sea level and approximately 2,000 m. Sometimes this species is called the greater Japanese shrew mole and another species, True's shrew mole, is called the "lesser Japanese shrew mole".

The species is an omnivore, but their diet is largely composed of invertebrates and plants, which is why they tend to inhabit soil that is nutrient-rich.

Heinrich Bürger, assistant of Philipp Franz von Siebold, collected specimens of Urotrichus talpoides near Dejima between 1824 and 1826, found lying dead in the fields, which were ultimately described by Temminck after shipping them to the Netherlands.

References

External links 
 Film on YouTube

Talpidae
Endemic mammals of Japan
Pleistocene mammals of Asia
Mammals described in 1841
Taxa named by Coenraad Jacob Temminck
Taxonomy articles created by Polbot